The 2011 Maldives FA Cup Final was the 24th Final of the Maldives FA Cup.

Route to the final

Match

Details

See also
2011 Maldives FA Cup

References

FA Cup Results (2011) at FAMaldives.com

Maldives FA Cup finals
FA Cup